Titanolabis is a genus of earwigs in the subfamily Anisolabidinae (though formerly in its own subfamily). It was cited by Srivastava in Part 2 of Fauna of India.

Species
The genus includes the following species:

 Titanolabis bormansi Srivastava, 1983
 Titanolabis centaurea Steinmann, 1985
 Titanolabis colossea (Dohrn, 1864)
 Titanolabis gigas Steinmann, 1989

References

External links

 The Earwig Research Centre's Titanolabis database Source for references: type Titanolabis in the "genus" field and click "search".

Dermaptera genera
Anisolabididae